Mukesh Bansal is an Indian businessman who founded Indian fashion e-commerce company Myntra and currently serves as the CEO of cult.fit of which he is also the co-founder. Mukesh has been listed in the Best 40 Under 40 Entrepreneurs by Fortune magazine.

Early life 
Bansal was born in Haridwar, Uttarakhand . He has done his BTech from IIT Kanpur. After graduating in 1997, he worked with Deloitte as a systems analyst in Chicago for two years. He was inspired by the dotcom boom that was progressing in San Francisco in full swing and moved to the Bay area in 1999. After giving up a job portal venture, which he started with a friend, Bansal worked at eWanted, Centrata, NexTag, newScale which were all early stage companies in Silicon Valley. His role in these startup included that of engineer and product manager across technology and business enterprises.

Career

Myntra
Bansal's experience at Silicon Valley propelled him to launch Myntra in 2007 along with Ashutosh Lawania and Vineet Saxena. Myntra was initially a personalised gifting startup and eventually turned into a foremost player in the fashion e-commerce segment. In 2014, Myntra was acquired by Flipkart for $330 million, which was the largest e-commerce related acquisition in India. Bansal continued as the chairman of Myntra board and managed the commerce and advertising platform until 2016.

Flipkart
After Flipkart's acquisition of Myntra, Mukesh joined Flipkart as Head of Commerce & Advertising Business. In this role Mukesh revamped the e-commerce company's talent philosophy. Under his leadership, Flipkart went on to achieve $5 billion in annual revenue.

cult.fit
Mukesh co-founded Cult.fit, a fitness and well-being start-up, with Ankit Nagori in 2016.

Olympics Gold Quest
Mukesh is also on the board of Olympics Gold Quest, a non-profit foundation that promotes sports and games.

References 

Year of birth missing (living people)
Living people
Indian investors